Joel Jacobson (born September 15, 1951, in Langdon, North Dakota, United States) is an American curler.

At the national level, he is a 1997 United States men's champion curler. Also he is a 1986 United States mixed champion curler.

He is a four-time North Dakota State men's curling champion and eight-time North Dakota mixed curling champion.

Awards
Ann Brown Sportsmanship Award: 2007

Teams

Men's

Mixed

Personal life
He started curling in 1978 at the age of 27.

He is married to Lisa (with whom he won the 1986 US mixed curling championship); they have three children - sons Zach and Zane (who are also curlers) and daughter Jennifer.

Jacobson is employed as a farmer.

He graduated with a bachelor's degree from North Dakota State University.

References

External links

Living people
1951 births
People from Cavalier County, North Dakota
Sportspeople from North Dakota
American male curlers
American curling champions
Farmers from North Dakota
North Dakota State University alumni